Tenino station, located in Tenino, Washington, was built by the Northern Pacific Railway in 1914 along the mainline from Portland, Oregon to Tacoma, Washington.

The depot is rectangular in shape and is made out of the local sandstone. (The sandstone quarry located east of the rail line was also listed in the National Register of Historic Places.) The architecture is a modernized Richardsonian style with simplified stone coursework and arched windows. The depot had a passenger waiting area on one end and a freight room on the other. The agent's office was located between the two rooms.

The depot ceased serving passengers in the 1950s, but continued to handle freight into the 1960s. It was finally closed in 1965. The depot remained abandoned. In 1975, the Burlington Northern Railroad (the successor of the Northern Pacific) gave the depot to the City of Tenino instead of demolishing it as a surplus property. The city then moved it alongside an old Northern Pacific branchline, adjacent to the old sandstone quarry.

The city refurbished the depot and turned it into the Tenino Depot Museum, a museum of local history. Exhibits include a press used to make the original wood money, logging and quarry tools, railroad memorabilia, a 1920s doctor's office, and local antiques and historic artifacts.  The museum is open weekend afternoons.

The depot was listed in the National Register due to its association with the development of Tenino as well as its association with the development of railroads in Washington.

External links
Tenino Depot Museum
 South Sound Heritage Association

References

Hansen, David M. Tenino Depot (Thurston County, Washington). National Register of Historic Places Inventory-Nomination Form, 1975. On file at the National Park Service, Washington, DC.

Tenino, Washington
Railway stations on the National Register of Historic Places in Washington (state)
Former Northern Pacific Railway stations in Washington (state)
Railway stations in the United States opened in 1914
Railway stations closed in 1965
History museums in Washington (state)
Museums in Thurston County, Washington
Railroad museums in Washington (state)
Relocated buildings and structures in Washington (state)
National Register of Historic Places in Thurston County, Washington
1914 establishments in Washington (state)
1965 disestablishments in Washington (state)
Former Great Northern Railway (U.S.) stations
Former Union Pacific Railroad stations in Washington (state)